This is a list of the number-one hits and albums of 2002 on Italian Charts.

See also
2002 in music
List of number-one hits in Italy

References

External links
FIMI archives
Hit Parade Italia

2002 in Italian music
2002 record charts
2002